The 2018 Adelaide Football Club season was the Adelaide Football Club's 28th season in the AFL. It was also its second season in the AFL Women's and its 5th season fielding a reserves team in the SANFL. The men's team started the season successfully, winning the inaugural AFLX competition.

AFL

List changes

After only making one appearance at AFL level in the 2017 season, two-time club champion Scott Thompson decided to retire. Before trade period began, the Crows announced that they would not be renewing the contracts of Troy Menzel and Dean Gore. They also officially announced that Sam Shaw had been removed from the rookie list after being kept on it during the 2017 season for administrative reasons.

Adelaide were able to secure two first round draft picks (one in the 2017 draft and one in the 2018 draft) for the key defender. During the trade period Adelaide also traded Harrison Wigg for Pick 39 and brought  veteran Sam Gibson into the side in exchange for Pick 91.

Before the 2017 national draft, the Crows also delisted Cam Ellis-Yolmen and Jono Beech. Beech was told that he would not be offered another contract, but the club committed to re-drafting Ellis-Yolmen in the 2018 rookie draft. The team also nominated Jackson Edwards, the son of dual premiership player Tyson Edwards, for a father-son selection. Edwards was not picked up during the national draft by any team, and as a result he automatically joined the Crows list with their final selection in the rookie draft.

Adelaide only used two draft picks in the national draft. With their first round pick the Crows selected South Australian forward/midfielder Darcy Fogarty. At the start of 2017 Fogarty had been considered a contender for the number one draft pick, but his 2017 season was ended in July when he suffered an injury requiring knee surgery and he slipped down the draft to pick 12, enabling the Crows to select him. The Crows' second pick was in round three, the pick they had received for trading Wigg to Gold Coast, and they used it to draft Andrew McPherson, who they hadn't expected to still be available.

Retirements and delistings

Trades

National draft

Rookie draft

Squad

Season summary

AFLX

Adelaide participated in Group A of the inaugural AFLX competition. All matches were played at Cooper Stadium in Adelaide on Thursday, 15 February. Though Adelaide mainly played depth players rather than a top-level squad, experienced trio Cam Ellis-Yolmen, Curtly Hampton and Kyle Cheney, all of whom had missed much of 2017 due to injury, had opportunities to perform well.

Pre-season

The Crows had to rest several key players for JLT Community Series matches due to injury recovery, such as captain Taylor Walker, key defender Daniel Talia and midfielders Rory Sloane and Hugh Greenwood.

Game 1
The Crows went into the JLT Community Series knowing that they would be without several players due to injury, notably including captain Taylor Walker, who was set to return from a foot injury in time for the first match of the regular season. In addition, midfielders Brad Crouch and Hugh Greenwood were left out of the team for the first game due to better manage their recoveries from injury. However, the first match was also the first opportunity for off-season recruit Bryce Gibbs to play a full match with the Crows. In the absence of both Taylor Walker and Rory Sloane, Tom Lynch was named the captain for Adelaide's match against Fremantle. During training for the match, defender Daniel Talia rolled his ankle and was withdrawn from the team, replaced with draftee Darcy Fogarty.

The Crows got out to a 29-point lead at half-time, but Fremantle fought back to get a lead of 9 points deep into the last quarter. The Crows scored the final three goals of the game to win by 10 points. Among the Crows' best players were Gibbs (with 27 possessions and a goal) and Matt Crouch (with 36 disposals), who was dominant in the stoppages. Acting captain Lynch was also impressive as a link-up forward.

Game 2
Talia returned from injury and joined the team for the first time of the year, along with Sloane, Greenwood, Eddie Betts, Richard Douglas and Kyle Hartigan, with the Crows fielding 25 players in the pre-season derby against crosstown rivals . Again the Crows had a commanding lead at half-time but allowed their opposition to get back into the game. This time they had a 26-point lead which Port Adelaide overcame, and they lost the game by 26 points themselves, only scoring three goals in the second half of the game. Small forward Lachlan Murphy also performed well for the second match in a row to put his name forwards.

Home and Away season

The fixture for the 2018 home and away season was announced on 31 October 2017. Adelaide will host  in a re-match of the 2017 AFL Grand Final in round 2 on a Thursday night at the Adelaide Oval. Bryce Gibbs will play against former side  for the first time in round 7, then the Crows will face off against ex-Crow Jake Lever for the first time when they play  in round 10.

Round 1
Due to injuries from the pre-season, there was uncertainty about whether or not Taylor Walker, due to a foot injury, and Brad Crouch, due to abdominal strain, would be playing. According to Daniel Talia, the Crows were taking a cautious approach, unwilling to risk using players who had not had a full pre-season, and as a result neither played in round 1. Instead of Walker, the Crows played debutant Darcy Fogarty, who made his debut alongside Tom Doedee (who was in the side to replace Jake Lever, who had left the club to play for ) and Lachlan Murphy.

Breaking with their normal routine for matches in Melbourne, the Crows elected to fly to Melbourne a day early to have a closed training session in an undisclosed location. On the day of the match, Sam Gibson, listed to play his first match for the Crows since moving from  the previous season, was withdrawn from the squad due to hamstring tightness. Having played 130 consecutive games for North Melbourne before being delisted, this put an end to the longest-running streak of consecutive matches played in the AFL at the time.

During the first quarter of the match, Richard Douglas was reported by the field umpires for rough conduct on Essendon player Zach Merrett during a collision which resulted in a concussion for Merrett, ruling Merrett out of the rest of the match. The match was tight and low-scoring during the first half, with Essendon going into half-time with a 5-point lead. The Crows then opened up more opportunities for scoring in the third quarter and outscored Essendon by seven goals to three to take a 20-point lead themselves. Gibbs had 35 disposals, including seven clearances and two goals in the third quarter.

Despite their dominant position going into the final quarter, the Crows were only able to score one more goal for the match and lost by 12 points. Making the result worse for them was a groin injury to Curtly Hampton, who had already spent most of the previous season out of the side due to injury. This was their first loss to Essendon since 2014.

Round 2
During the week after Adelaide's loss to Essendon, the Crows' controversial pre-season training camp was leaked to the press, with reports emerging that players had been distressed at the camp. Journalist Sam McClure claimed that Taylor Walker had "sent a fairly terse text message to teammates demanding to know who it was that leaked the information", and also claimed that one player at the club was re-considering their future with the team.

Walker returned to Adelaide's team for his first match of the season, against 2017 Grand Final opponents . In total there were seven changes from the team that had played in the grand final to the team named to play in the match. During the game the Crows suffered injuries to four different players, with Matt Crouch leaving the ground in the second quarter due to a hamstring injury and David Mackay leaving the ground to due concussion from a collision with Richmond player Josh Caddy. Rory Sloane and Daniel Talia also left the ground with injuries, but both returned to finish the game.

In the first half Josh Jenkins had an impressive performance against All-Australian defender Alex Rance, kicking four goals against him, followed by a fifth later in the game. Due to strong performances in the forward line from both Jenkins and Walker, the Crows led at the end of every quarter and finished off with a 36-point win.

Round 3
 dominated most of the play in the first half of the match, but were unable to convert that to a scoreboard lead and the Crows still led by 10 points at half time. During the half time break, coach Don Pyke instructed the players to be more predictable in how they passed the ball to each other and as a result the Crows were able to control the game more and finish the match 49-point winners.

Round 4
The Crows were dominated by the Magpies in the first half to trail by 52 points during the third quarter. They kicked four goals in a row to bring themselves back into the contest, only trailing by 30 points early in the final quarter, but Collingwood then kicked five of the last seven goals to seal the match. Crows star forward Eddie Betts injured his left hamstring and was unable to finish the match.

Round 5

Round 6

Round 7

Round 8

Round 9

Round 10

Round 11

Round 12

Round 13

Ladder

AFL Women's

List changes

Retirements and delistings

Women's draft

Undrafted free agents

Rookies

Rookie draft

Rookie signings

Squad

Season summary

The full fixture for the 2018 AFL Women's season was announced on 27 October 2017. Four of the seven games were home games for the Crows, three of them played at Norwood Oval and the final home game at TIO Stadium in Darwin.

They needed to win their final match against  to make it to the Grand Final, but despite leading at half-time they lost the match by 21 points and finished the season in fifth.

Round 1

The season opener was a re-match of the 2017 AFL Women's Grand Final, which the Crows had won to claim the inaugural AFL Women's premiership cup. The Crows went into the game missing Courtney Cramey and Abbey Holmes due to injury, and Jenna McCormick due to her W-League duties, then co-captain and 2017 AFLW Best and Fairest Erin Phillips was a late withdrawal due to a quad injury. This damaged the Crows' ability to win the ball through the midfield and left gaps in their team structure, allowing Lion Sabrina Frederick-Traub to dominate in Brisbane's forward line. The Crows failed to score in the first quarter, but took the lead going into half-time thanks to goals to Jones, Wallace and Randall. Despite having the momentum, the Crows failed to score in the second half while Brisbane scored 3.3 and won the match by 12 points as a result.

Round 2
After keeping close with Melbourne for the first quarter, but the Demons kicked four goals to one against the wind in the second quarter to reach an unassailable lead. Melbourne's midfield trio of Elise O'Dea, Daisy Pearce and Karen Paxman dominated the game, collecting 54 possessions between them. The Crows lost by 32 points, and senior coach Bec Goddard emphasized after the match that it wasn't solely due to the team missing Phillips.

Round 3
In addition the Crows moved forward Sarah Perkins into the midfield with great effect after she had struggled to make an impact in the first two rounds. In the last quarter the Crows gained a one-point lead only for the Bulldogs to control the flow of play for six or seven minutes late in the game. The Crows' defense held them to just one point which leveled the scores. At the end of the game Rachael Killian kicked a behind to put the Crows in front and Jenna McCormick kicked her second goal after the siren to give Adelaide their first win of the season and keep their premiership defense alive.

Round 4
The round 4 match was a wet and low-scoring affair. After only three goals were scored in the first half, none were scored at all in the third quarter. The Crows went into the final quarter nine points down before scoring the first ten points of the quarter to lead by a point. The Giants scored just one point for the quarter and drew the game. During the match, Ebony Marinoff broke the AFLW tackles record with 21 tackles, more than had ever been recorded in a single AFL or AFLW game.

Round 5
After being at the bottom of the ladder after their draw against the Giants, the Crows needed to win in order to keep their premiership defense alive. After a tight start to the game, the Crows broke free in the second quarter, scoring three goals in just two minutes to extend their lead to 23 points by three-quarter time. Despite not scoring in the third quarter, they only conceded three points and finished with a 35-point win. During the second quarter, Phillips left the ground in the second quarter to look after her quad, which still hadn't fully recovered from her earlier injury. The win took Adelaide from eighth to fifth on the ladder, only half a game below second, the spot they needed to finish to make it into the Grand Final.

Round 6
Due to the weather being very hot and humid (32 degrees Celsius and 71 percent humidity), the quarter-time, half-time and three quarter-time breaks were extended for the match. The match was close, with the lead changing several times throughout the game. Fremantle player Dana Hooker kicked a goal with less than five minutes to go to ensure a close finish, but the Crows held on to win the game by 4 points. With the win they went into the top two for the first time of the season.

Round 7
The Crows went into their final match against Collingwood as favourites and were expected to win and make their way into the Grand Final to defend their premiership. Crows co-captain Chelsea Randall suffered a head knock late in the second quarter and was forced to sit out the rest of the match. Randall had been instrumental in getting the Crows their 10-point lead at half-time, and without her they were unable to stop the Collingwood forward line. With less than five minutes remaining in the final quarter the Crows were still within 7 points of the lead and could have won, but they gave away a free kick deep in a ruck contest deep inside Collingwood's forward 50 to concede a goal, which sealed the win for the Magpies. Because of the loss, Adelaide finished fifth on the ladder and missed out on playing in the Grand Final.

Ladder

See also
2018 Adelaide Crows pre-season camp

References

Adelaide Football Club seasons
Adelaide Crows
Adelaide